The Atlanta washerwomen strike of 1881 was a labor strike in Atlanta involving washerwomen. Beginning in July 1881, the strike was carried out primarily by African American women who argued for increased wages and greater autonomy in their work. The strike ended in August with some success for the strikers.

Background 
In Atlanta following the Civil War, many African American women were employed as washerwomen, also known as laundresses. There were more African American women employed as washerwomen than in any other domestic work, representing over half of their total workforce. Many of those employed in this field made between $4 to $8 per month.

In July 1881, several washerwomen in the city founded the Washing Society. At the first meeting, held in a local black church, officials were elected and a uniform rate for washerwomen was decided. While initially consisting of only 20 washerwomen, within three weeks the Washing Society boasted 3,000 members. Society members engaged in door-to-door canvassing and garnered support from several of the black churches in the city. On July 19, the Washing Society declared a strike, demanding higher wages. Additionally, they wanted a flat rate of $1 per twelve pounds of laundry and greater work autonomy.

Course of the strike 
The strike began several weeks before the start of the International Cotton Exposition, a world's fair in Atlanta that was expected to bring a significant number of visitors to the city. The strikers received significant resistance from white authorities and businesspeople in the city. The Atlanta Constitution (which American historian Tera Hunter has called "the opposition's unofficial mouthpiece") was initially dismissive of the strike, though as the strike continued, they began to acknowledge the strength of the strikers. Many strikers were arrested or fined over the course of the strike action. The Atlanta City Council also threatened to impose a business tax on the washerwomen, and many of the strikers' landlords raised their tenants rates. In one such case, a striker who couldn't afford to pay one of the fines was sentenced to 40 days of working on a chain gang. Despite this, the strike continued and spurred labor disputes with other domestic workers in the city. During the strike, African American waiters at the National Hotel refused to work until their wages were increased.

In early August, five hundred women strikers met at Wheat Street Baptist Church to discuss the strike. Shortly thereafter, on August 3, the strikers issued an ultimatum to mayor James W. English, saying they would pay a license fee of $25 "as a protection so we can control the washing for the city", but would continue to strike if their demands for higher wages were not met. Following this ultimatum, the city acquiesced and allowed the washerwomen greater autonomy and higher rates in exchange for a $25 license fee.

Aftermath 
The strike is one of several organized by domestic workers in the Southern United States during this time, being preceded by strikes in Galveston, Texas in 1877 and Jackson, Mississippi in 1866, though neither was larger than the Atlanta strike. 

In analyzing the success of the strike, Hunter cited that while some washerwomen saw wage increases, many did not, and low wages would continue to be an issue between washerwomen and their employers. Additionally, Hunter cited the fact that a second strike was threatened to take place during the International Cotton Exposition, though this never came to fruition. However, others have noted that the strike, significant for involving African American women during the early Jim Crow era, was successful in demonstrating the impact of black labor, and domestic work in particular, in the city.

References

Bibliography

Further reading 
 
 
 
 

1881 labor disputes and strikes
History of Atlanta
Labor disputes in Georgia (U.S. state)
1881 in Georgia (U.S. state)
July 1881 events
Labor disputes in the United States
August 1881 events
19th century in Atlanta
History of women in Georgia (U.S. state)